Donald Everett Ballard (born December 5, 1945) is a retired colonel of the Kansas National Guard and former member of the United States Navy. As a hospital corpsman in the Vietnam War, he received the Medal of Honor for his heroic actions on May 16, 1968.

Early life
Ballard was born in Kansas City, Missouri. He was married and was working in a dental lab when he decided to join the Navy in hopes of becoming a dentist someday.

United States Navy
Ballard enlisted in the United States Navy in 1965. After he completed navy recruit training and Hospital Corps School, he decided that he wanted to serve as a hospital corpsman with the United States Marine Corps and was sent to a Field Medical Service School. After he completed the course there, he was sent to Vietnam in 1967. Ballard was assigned as a navy corpsman with M Company, 3rd Battalion, 4th Marine Regiment, 3rd Marine Division in Quang Tri province, in South Vietnam.

On May 16, 1968, Ballard treated two Marines suffering from heat exhaustion, and when returning to his platoon from the casualty evacuation helicopter pad, his rifle company was attacked by a unit of North Vietnamese Army (NVA) soldiers. While under enemy fire, Ballard was attending to a wounded Marine when an enemy grenade landed near the wounded Marine, four other Marines, and himself. He immediately covered the grenade with his body to shield the five Marines from the blast. Realizing that the grenade failed to explode, he quickly threw it out of harm's way as it exploded, saving the Marines and himself from harm or death. He then continued on attending to wounded Marines during the firefight. For his actions, he received the United States of America's highest military decoration for valor, the Medal of Honor.

After having left the navy the previous year, Ballard received the Medal of Honor from President Richard M. Nixon and General William Westmoreland in 1970.

United States Army

Kansas Army National Guard

Ballard was selected for the United States Army's officer candidate school. General Westmoreland found out Ballard was switching over to the army and offered him a direct commission to be an active duty army officer, however Ballard turned it down for personal reasons. Ballard later joined the Kansas National Guard in 1970, and served as an ambulance platoon leader, company commander, and was tasked with creating the new Medical Detachment 5, a unit which performs medicals on guard members in order to save the cost of contracting outside medical help, and of which he was the first member and commander.

On April 5, 1998, Ballard was promoted to colonel by Major General James F. Reuger and served as Special Assistant to the Adjutant General until his retirement in 2000. Inducted into the National Guard Hall of Fame in November 2001, Ballard is the only living Kansas Guardsman to have received the Medal of Honor. He is also the subject of a memorial statue at the National Medical War Memorial in Kansas City, depicting Ballard during the action for which he received the Medal of Honor.

Ballard has been active in providing services to veterans and active duty military, including work towards opening a USO facility in downtown Kansas City.

Military awards
Ballard's military awards and decorations include:

Medal of Honor citation

Ballard's official Medal of Honor citation reads:

The President of the United States in the name of The Congress takes pride in presenting the MEDAL OF HONOR to

for service as set forth in the following

CITATION:

See also

List of Medal of Honor recipients for the Vietnam War

References

External links
 Interview at the Pritzker Military Museum & Library
 Exhibit of Valor: Reuniting the American Spirit

1945 births
Living people
United States Navy Medal of Honor recipients
United States Navy personnel of the Vietnam War
National Guard (United States) colonels
United States Navy sailors
United States Navy corpsmen
People from Kansas City, Missouri
Military personnel from Missouri
Missouri National Guard personnel
Vietnam War recipients of the Medal of Honor